Anacostia High School is a public high school in Anacostia, in the Southeast quadrant of the District of Columbia.

History

In August 2009, Friendship Public Charter School partnered with DC Public Schools to manage the high school. As a result, the school became known as the Academies at Anacostia and was split into four separate academies. In 2009-10, there were two ninth-grade academies (Sojourner Truth and Charles Drew), one 10-12th grade academy (Frederick Douglass), and one academy for under-credited and overage students (Matthew Henson). In 2010-11, the two ninth-grade academies will become 9-10th grade academies, while the larger 10-12th grade academy (Frederick Douglass) will become 11-12th. Matthew Henson academy will stay intact. In 2011-12, Sojourner Truth and Charles Drew will expand to 9-11th grades, while Frederick Douglass will only be seniors. In 2012-13, Sojourner Truth and Charles Drew will be fully operational 9-12th grade academies, and Frederick Douglass will no longer exist. 

This setup is based on the Small Learning Community (SLC) model.

Built in 1935, with subsequent additions in the 1940s, 50s, and 70s, the Anacostia High School was in desperate need of a complete renovation and modernization that would not only bring the school up to the highest educational standards but would also serve to transform the school building into a simple, understated canvas for the art and lives of its students.  Architectural design firm Sorg Architects designed the renovation of Anacostia High School to restore the exterior of the original building steeped in sustainable design practice.

Notable alumni
 Craig Anderson, former MLB player
 Lonny Baxter, NBA Basketball player
 Jean Carnahan, former U.S. Senator from Missouri
 Mel Carnahan, former governor of Missouri
 Art Faircloth, former NFL player
 Ronnie Gilbert, Folk Singer
 Frederick Drew Gregory, NASA Astronaut and NASA Deputy Administrator
 Cato June, former NFL player
 Lovell Pinkney, former NFL player
 Reggie Rucker, former NFL player
 Gene Schroeder, former NFL player

Notable events
On June 11, 2010, First Lady of the United States Michelle Obama gave the commencement address to the Class of 2010.

References

Anacostia
Public high schools in Washington, D.C.
African-American history of Washington, D.C.
Schools in Washington, D.C.
District of Columbia Public Schools